Kim Suyeong was a Korean poet.

Life
Kim Soo-young (1921–1968) was a Korean poet  and translator whose poetry explored love and freedom as poetic and political ideals.  Kim was born in Gwancheol-dong, Seoul on November 27, 1921. After graduating from the Sunrin Commercial High School, Kim departed for Japan to study at the Tokyo University of Commerce. He returned to Korea in 1943 to avoid the conscription of student soldiers in Japan. A year later, he moved to Jilin, Manchuria with his family and taught at the Jilin High School. At this time, Kim was also heavily involved in theatre work. Upon Korea's Independence in 1945, Kim returned to Seoul to work as interpreter and eventually transferred to the Department of English at Yonhui University as a senior though he eventually turned down this position. He was conscripted by the North Korean Army and became a prisoner of war. He was eventually released to the Geojedo Island Prisoner-of-War Camp in 1952, where he worked as an interpreter for the director of the hospital, and for the U.S 8th Army. Kim, who taught English at Sunrin Commercial High School later in life, began working for Weekly Pacific (Jugan taepyeongyang) and Pyeonghwa Newspaper after returning to Seoul in 1954. The following year, Kim retired from his work and began a poultry farming operation from his home, in order to devote himself to poetry, translation and literary criticism. He published a poetry collection entitled Play of the Moon (Dallaraui Jangnan), for which he received the first Poet's Association Award. He died on June 16, 1968, after being struck by a bus while in Seoul.

Work
Kim's literary orientation became clear when he led other young Korean poets in "The Second Half," a group dedicated to redirecting Korean poetry away from the traditionalism and lyricism of the early 1950s by confront social concerns by using language in a new way. Among the innovations were the use of surrealism, abstraction, prose, slang and profanity in Kim's poems. Kim's early poems were in a Modernist style, though later he changed directions, using everyday language in addressing social issues.  Many are political, either overtly or by hidden implication.

According to the scholar of Korean literature, Brother Anthony of Taizé, Kim's significance and impact only really took place after his death. He only published one volume of poetry (in 1959). Shortly before his death, he wrote a theoretical article which sparked a lively debate.

Perhaps his best-known poem is "Grass". The Kim Soo-young Contemporary Poetry Award is named in his honor.

Publications
 Dalnara-ui jangnan (A Game Played in the Moon), published in 1959, was the only book of poetry he produced in his lifetime.
 The Complete Works of Kim Su-young, Vol.1 (Poems).  Minumsa Publishing Group 2003, 394p, .

Translated works
 
 Kim Soo-Young (2005) Jenseits des Rausches. Gedichte.
(translated by Kang Yeo-Kyu and Uwe Kolbe) Edition Peperkorn: Thunum.
 Kim Soo-Young  (2001) Der Wächter der Wolke: ausgewählte Gedichte. (translated by Kim Miy-He and Sylvia Bräsel) Edition Peperkorn: Thunum.
 Brother Anthony <of Taizé>, translator and editor  (2001) Variations:  Three Korean Poets. Cornell East Asia series ; 110.

Works in Korean (Partial) 

 Grass (poet)
 One day while leaving the old palace
 waterfall

Awards
 The Society of Korean Poets Award for Poetry, 1958 (first recipient)
 The Kim Suyeong Literary Award was established 1981 in his honor
 In 2007, he was listed by the Korean Poets' Association among the ten most important modern Korean poets.

See also
Korean literature

References

Bibliography
 Variations: Three Korean Poets - Kim Su-Young, Shin Kyong-Nim, Lee Si-Young. Translated by Brother Anthony of Taizé and Young-Moo Kim. Cornell East Asia Series, No. 110. 2001 Bilingual CEAS Edition, 328 pages. 1-885445-10-5.
 Kim Su-Yong, Cent poèmes, translated into French and introduced and annotated by Kim Bona; introduction by Laurent Grisel; preface by Jean-Paul Michel. William Blake & Co. Edit., 2000. 192 pp. .
 Paik Nak-chung, "The Poetry of Kim Su-yong; The Living Kim Su-yong," Korea Journal, winter 1999.

External links
 literary officer website 
 Selected poems in English translation:  http://www.sogang.ac.kr/~anthony/SelectedPoems.htm
 Discussion of the poet in French:  https://web.archive.org/web/20070927230028/http://www.poesieschoisies.net/le_poete.php?V=45,,,poeme,11,,2-88340-022-9,,2,,,
 Discussion of the poet and two others in their stylistic and political setting:  https://web.archive.org/web/20050225234417/http://www.sogang.ac.kr/~anthony/Sheffield.htm
 Translation of Kim's "Watchman of the Clouds"
 Three of Kim's poems in English translation:
 Ten of Kim's poems in English translation
 British and American influence on Kim's poetry: https://web.archive.org/web/20110722134225/http://ref.daum.net/item/554537 (summary of Korean journal article)
 On Kim's poetic response to political conditions:  http://www.dbpia.com/view/ar_view.asp?arid=495397 (summary of Korean journal article)
 On Kim's view of poetry: (summary of Korean journal article)
 Hong Jung-sun,  "Poet Kim Su-young, Still Controversial," List, vol. 12, autumn 2013 at https://web.archive.org/web/20131102035510/http://www.list.or.kr/articles/article_view.htm?Div1=4&Idx=1218

1921 births
1968 deaths
South Korean male poets
20th-century South Korean poets
Society of Korean Poets Award winners
20th-century male writers
Road incident deaths in South Korea